Troy Nathan (born 9 October 1983) is a professional New Zealand-born rugby union player. Coming through Kelston Boys High School 1996-2001 representing New Zealand age grade at Rugby, Touch Football and Softball. In 2001 at the age of 17 years, he represented the New Zealand Men's touch rugby team. In 2002 he signed with Counties Manukau Rugby Union, staying until 2007. He then moved to Europe, and had 4 seasons with Connacht Rugby in Ireland, two seasons with Glasgow Warriors, and then, in 2013, made his way to the Italian Rugby Federation, playing the remaining 4 months with Mogliano Rugby, where he was part of the team winning the 2012-2013 Italian National Competition National Championship of Excellence. In 2013 he signed a 2-year deal with Lazio Roma Rugby that would see him there until 2015. In 2014 he also played for Zebre. He is qualified to play for Ireland.
Nathan played in the Super 14 & Air New Zealand Cup competition. He has played for New Zealand at youth level. He is a utility back, having played in the number 10, 12 and 13 positions, and a goal-kicking specialist.

During his professional rugby career, Nathan maintained part-time studies with a view to life post-rugby. He completed a diploma in Diet & Nutrition, and then specialised in Child and Adolescent Nutrition. He has also studied for a Sales and Marketing Degree, where he looks to gain a network base and more insight in Part-time Sports Management. Troy also has a background in the fitness industry as a qualified Personal Trainer with two years experience. He has completed the IRB Level 1 & 2 coaching course, providing resource coaching at clubs and schools across all ages and levels.

References

https://www.youtube.com/watch?v=zv918nMuglI

External links
Glasgow Warriors profile
Connacht Rugby profile

1983 births
Living people
Glasgow Warriors players
New Zealand rugby union coaches
New Zealand rugby union players
Touch footballers
New Zealand sportsmen
Counties Manukau rugby union players
Connacht Rugby players
Mogliano Rugby players
Zebre Parma players
Expatriate rugby union players in Scotland
New Zealand expatriate sportspeople in Scotland
Expatriate rugby union players in Ireland
New Zealand expatriate sportspeople in Ireland